Masashi Tanaka (田中 政志, born June 10, 1962) is a Japanese manga artist best known for Gon, his silent manga starring a miniature dinosaur. He began publishing Gon in 1991. GON is possibly his most well known work, famous for being a silent comic throughout its entire run.

Works

Serials
 
 
 
 
 
 Gon (1992-2002, 7 volumes)

Short stories
  (1985) - Submission for the 8th Tetsuya Chiba Awards. English adaptation published by Dark Horse in issues 40 to 44 of Cheval Noir.
  (1986) - Submission for the 9th Tetsuya Chiba Awards.
 CAESAR (1987) - Submission for the 10th Tetsuya Chiba Awards.
  (1988) - Submission for the 11th Tetsuya Chiba Awards.
  (1989) - Winner of the 12th Tetsuya Chiba Awards. English adaptation published by Dark Horse in issues 24, 25, and 26 of Cheval Noir in 1991 and 1992.

References

External links

1962 births
Living people
Manga artists from Shimane Prefecture
People from Shimane Prefecture
Osaka University of Arts alumni